The men's hammer throw at the 1946 European Athletics Championships was held in Oslo, Norway, at Bislett Stadion on 22 August 1946.

Medalists

Results

Final
22 August

Qualification
22 August

Participation
According to an unofficial count, 11 athletes from 10 countries participated in the event.

 (1)
 (1)
 (1)
 (1)
 (1)
 (1)
 (1)
 (2)
 (1)
 (1)

References

Hammer throw
Hammer throw at the European Athletics Championships